Callisthenia angusta is a moth of the subfamily Arctiinae. It is found in French Guiana.

References

Lithosiini